Media Sporting Club, also known as El E'lameen SC, is an Egyptian football club based in 6th of October city, Giza Governorate, Cairo, Egypt. The club plays in the Egyptian Second Division, the second-highest league in the Egyptian football league system.

Egyptian Second Division
Football clubs in Egypt